Markham (also Markham Station) is an unincorporated community in Morgan County, Illinois, United States.

Notes

Unincorporated communities in Morgan County, Illinois
Unincorporated communities in Illinois